Attia Shalan is an Egyptian bodybuilder who won a gold medal at the 2011 Pan Arab Games, and first place  in the over 100 kg category and overall 'Champion of Champions' at the 2014 World Amateur Bodybuilding Championships.

References

Living people
Egyptian bodybuilders
Year of birth missing (living people)
Place of birth missing (living people)